Medicine Park is a town in Comanche County, Oklahoma, United States, situated in the Wichita Mountains near the entrance to the  Wichita Mountain Wildlife Refuge. Medicine Park has a long history as a vintage cobblestone resort town. Medicine Park is located near the city of Lawton and Fort Sill. It is an exurb, part of the Lawton Metropolitan Statistical Area. Many of the original structures are constructed of naturally formed cobblestones—these red granite cobblestones are unique to the Wichita Mountains.  The population was 382 at the 2010 census.

History 
Medicine Park was founded on July 4, 1908, by Elmer Thomas, a young lawyer who had just become a member of the Oklahoma State Senate and would end his career in 1951 as a U.S. senator.

In the spring of 1906, five years after the establishment of the Wichita Mountains National Forest, Elmer Thomas envisioned the need not only for a recreational area but for a permanent water source for the newly founded nearby city of Lawton.

When the resort first opened, it consisted merely of a large surplus Army tent with a wooden floor where hot meals were served. Two dams were constructed on Medicine Creek to form Bath Lake Swimming Hole, and a limited number of campsites were constructed.

Tourists came to Medicine Park from around Oklahoma and North Texas. Soon, there were two inns—the Outside Inn and the Apache Inn.
Bob Wills and The Texas Playboys became regulars at the Dance Hall from 1929 through the late 1930s. Soon numerous other famous bands of the day made their way through Medicine Park en route to big city venues in Oklahoma City, Dallas, and Fort Worth.

The nearby Wichita Mountains Wildlife Refuge and Lake Lawtonka attracted thousands of people each weekend and throughout the seasons. Medicine Park became the “playground” for the state's rich, famous and notorious. Outlaws and horse thieves mixed with noted politicians and businessmen, soldiers and officers from Fort Sill, families, and socialites in the new cobblestone community. The pages of the town's colorful history are filled with such figures as Will Rogers, Wiley Post, Frank Phillips, Al Capone, Bonnie and Clyde, Pretty Boy Floyd, Lil Hardin Armstrong, Colonel Jack Abernathy, Les Brown, Roy Rogers, and Dale Evans.

An Oklahoma television station reported on June 13, 2018, that Expedia had named Medicine Park as "... the fifth prettiest town in the U.S." The Lake Lawtonka Trails, including around Medicine Park, were rated by one mountain bike enthusiast site as the No. 1 best mountain bike trail area in Oklahoma, out of sixty-two contenders.

People of interest
Elmer Thomas, the founder of Medicine Park, served in the Oklahoma State Senate from 1907 to 1920, was a member of the United States House of Representatives from 1923 to 1927 and a United States senator from 1927 until 1951.

Geography
Medicine Park is located at  (34.733270, -98.483923).

Demographics

According to the census of 2010, the town had 382 people living in 191 households and 112 families. There were 306 housing units at an average density of 151.8 per square mile (58.6/km2). The racial makeup of the town was 88.2% White, 0.8% African American, 3.7% Native American, 0.8% Pacific Islander, 2.4% from other races, and 3.7% from two or more races. Hispanic or Latino of any race were 6.0% of the population.
Of the 191 households, 16.2% had children under the age of 18 living in them, 49.7% were married couples living together, 5.8% had a female householder with no husband present, and 41.4% were non-families. Of all households 35.6% were composed of individuals, and 8.3% had someone living alone who was 65 years of age or older. The average household size was 2.00 and the average family size was 2.58.

In the town, the population was spread out, with 14.1% under the age of 18, 3.7% from 18 to 24, 29.3% from 25 to 44, 39.8% from 45 to 64, and 13.1% who were 65 years of age or older. The median age was 47.6 years. For every 100 females, there were 100 males. For every 100 females age 18 and over, there were 105 males.

According to the 2000 census, the median income for a household in the town was $26,607, and the median income for a family was $33,929. Males had a median income of $22,321 versus $18,854 for females. The per capita income for the town was $13,236. About 19.6% of families and 18.1% of the population were below the poverty line, including 28.9% of those under age 18 and 16.7% of those age 65 or over.

Historic Structures

The following are NRHP-listed places in and around Medicine Park:
The Medicine Park Hotel and Annex, on E. Lake Drive.
Holy City of the Wichitas Historic District, in the vicinity of Medicine Park at 262 Holy City Road.  This is the site of the longest running passion play in North America (1926), with permanent sets built with native granite at the west end of the Wichita Mountains Wildlife Refuge.

Utilities
Medicine Park Telephone Company provides service, including DSL, to the town and the surrounding area. 
Telephone, Internet, and Digital TV Services is provided by Hilliary Communications.

Gallery

References

External links
 
 
Town website
Local area e-magazine and source for information
Encyclopedia of Oklahoma History and Culture
Images of America: Medicine Park, Oklahoma’s First Resort

Towns in Comanche County, Oklahoma
Towns in Oklahoma
Cobblestone architecture
Populated places established in 1908
1908 establishments in Oklahoma